Avicii Experience is a museum located in Stockholm, Sweden. It is built in the memory of Swedish music producer, Avicii, to exhibit his work.

As an interactive museum, Avicii Experience has a virtual studio, where visitors can record a version of Avicii's songs.

History
Avicii Experience was co-founded by Per Sundin and Klas Bergling, the founder of Tim Bergling Foundation.

The museum was formally opened on 25 February 2022.

References

Avicii
Music museums in Sweden